The decade of the 1160s in art involved some significant events.

Events
1166: Henry the Lion has the first bronze statue (a heraldic lion) north of the Alps erected at Dankwarderode Castle.

Paintings

Births
 1162: Fujiwara no Teika -  Japanese poet, critic, calligrapher, novelist, anthologist, scribe, and scholar (died 1241)
 1160-1165: Ma Yuan – Chinese landscape painter whose work formed the basis of the Ma-Xia school of painting (died 1225)

Deaths
 1167: Yang Buzhi Chinese master of ink paintings of plum blossoms in the Song Dynasty (born 1098)
 1165: Ibn al-Tilmīdh - Syriac Christian physician, pharmacist, poet, musician and calligrapher (born 1073)

Art
Decades of the 12th century in art